Tsetska Tsacheva Dangovska (born 24 May 1958) is a Bulgarian politician from GERB and a jurist. She was the Minister of Justice of the Republic of Bulgaria from 4 May 2017 to 5 April 2019. She had previously held the position of Chairwoman of the National Assembly of Bulgaria on two occasions. Tsetska Tsacheva is the first woman to ever chair the National Assembly of Bulgaria since its establishment in 1878.

Background
Tsacheva was born in Dragana, Ugarchin Municipality, Lovech Province. She finished the Pleven High School of Mathematics in 1976 and graduated in law from Sofia University.

A member of the Pleven Bar Association, she practised as a lawyer and was subsequently a head legal advisor to the Pleven Municipality for seven and a half years until 2007.

Tsacheva is married to the architect Rumen Dangovski and has a son, also named Rumen, who is a college student studying Math at the Massachusetts Institute Of Technology in the United States.

Political career

Until the democratic changes in 1989, Tsacheva was a member of the Bulgarian Communist Party, though she quit promptly after the fall of the People's Republic of Bulgaria. In 2007, she joined the Pleven Municipal Council as a member of Boyko Borisov's party GERB. Tsacheva was GERB's candidate for mayor of Pleven in 2007, but she only came third as Nayden Zelenogorski of the Union of the Democratic Forces won his third term in the first round. Tsacheva was also behind the Bulgarian Socialist Party's Vasil Antonov in that election.

In the 2009 Bulgarian parliamentary election, Tsacheva headed GERB's voting list in Pleven Province and was also the party's proportional candidate for that constituency. She won the proportional elections in Pleven Province with 36.92%, or 54,880 votes. After her party's decisive electoral victory, she was selected as GERB's candidate for Chairwoman of the National Assembly of Bulgaria and was unanimously elected to that post by 227 votes out of 240 and no votes against.

Tsacheva was considered a member of the reform-minded group around Deputy Prime Minister Simeon Djankov. She ensured the passage of several legislative packages to reduce the burden on business and avoid a meltdown of the banking system.

Presidential candidate
Tsacheva was nominated to be her party's candidate for the 2016 Presidential election. Plamen Manushev was chosen to be the vice-presidential candidate. She lost the run-off to Rumen Radev, former air force commander. As a reaction, prime minister Boyko Borisov resigned.

References

|-

|-

1958 births
Chairpersons of the National Assembly of Bulgaria
Bulgarian jurists
Bulgarian women in politics
Candidates for President of Bulgaria
People from Lovech Province
Living people
Members of the National Assembly (Bulgaria)
Female justice ministers
Justice ministers of Bulgaria